The National Wool Act of 1954 (Title VII of Agricultural Act of 1954 (P.L. 83-690)) provided for a new and permanent price support program for wool and mohair to encourage increased domestic production through incentive payments.

Wool and mohair commodity programs were in effect through marketing year 1995, at which time it was terminated under the explicit mandate of P.L. 103–130, Sec. 1.

See also 
Amendments to the National Wool Act

References 

 

1954 in law
United States federal agriculture legislation
83rd United States Congress
Wool trade